A regent is a person appointed to govern a state  because the monarch is a minor, absent, incapacitated or unable to discharge the powers and duties of the monarchy, or the throne is vacant and the new monarch has not yet been determined. One variation is in the Monarchy of Liechtenstein, where a competent monarch may choose to assign regency to their of-age heir, handing over the majority of their responsibilities to prepare the heir for future succession. The rule of a regent or regents is called a regency. A regent or regency council may be formed ad hoc or in accordance with a constitutional rule. Regent is sometimes a formal title granted to a monarch's most trusted advisor or personal assistant. If the regent is holding their position due to their position in the line of succession, the compound term prince regent is often used; if the regent of a minor is their mother, she would be referred to as queen regent.

If the formally appointed regent is unavailable or cannot serve on a temporary basis, a  may be appointed to fill the gap.

In a monarchy, a regent usually governs due to one of these reasons, but may also be elected to rule during the interregnum when the royal line has died out. This was the case in the Kingdom of Finland and the Kingdom of Hungary, where the royal line was considered extinct in the aftermath of World War I. In Iceland, the regent represented the King of Denmark as sovereign of Iceland until the country became a republic in 1944. In the Polish–Lithuanian Commonwealth (1569–1795), kings were elective, which often led to a fairly long interregnum.

Famous regency periods include that of the Prince Regent, later George IV of the United Kingdom, giving rise to many terms such as Regency era and Regency architecture. Strictly this period lasted from 1811 to 1820, when his father George III was insane, though when used as a period label it generally covers a wider period. For a period of a month and a half, the Second French Empire was a regency. The Emperor departed with his army, giving his political powers to his wife who essentially carried out all his roles and even sent him orders. He would never be able to return to France, and the empire ended as a regency two days after his defeat and imprisonment at the Battle of Sedan.

 Liechtenstein (under Alois, Hereditary Prince of Liechtenstein) is the only country with an active regency. In 2016, at the age of 96, Prem Tinsulanonda became the oldest regent of any nation, when he became the regent for Rama X of Thailand. Previously this record was held by Prince Regent Luitpold of Bavaria, who was 91 at the end of his regency.

Other uses

The term regent may refer to positions lower than the ruler of a country. The term may be used in the governance of organisations, typically as an equivalent of "director", and held by all members of a governing board rather than just the equivalent of the chief executive.

In the Society of Jesus, a regent is an individual training to be a Jesuit and who has completed his novitiate and philosophy studies but has not yet progressed to theology studies. A regent in the Jesuits is often assigned to teach in a school or some other academic institution.

Some university managers in North America are called regents, and a management board for a college or university may be titled the "Board of Regents". In New York State, all activities related to public and private education (P-12 and postsecondary) and professional licensure are administered by the Board of Regents of the University of the State of New York, the appointed members of which are called regents.

Europe 
The term "regent" is also used for members of governing bodies of institutions such as the national banks of France and Belgium.

In the Dutch Republic, the members of the ruling class, not formally hereditary but forming a de facto patrician class, were informally known collectively as regenten (the Dutch plural for regent) because they typically held positions as "regent" on the boards of town councils, as well as charitable and civic institutions. The regents group portrait, regentenstuk or regentessenstuk for female boards in Dutch, literally "regents' piece", is a group portrait of the board of trustees, called regents or regentesses, of a charitable organization or guild. This type of group portrait was popular in Dutch Golden Age painting during the 17th and 18th centuries.

Again in Belgium and France (régent in French, or in Dutch), "regent" is the official title of a teacher in a lower secondary school (junior high school), who does not require a college degree but is trained in a specialized école normale (normal school).

Southeast Asia 
 
Consequently, in the successor state of Indonesia, the term regent is used in English to mean a bupati, the head of a kabupaten (second level local government).

In Malaysia, a regent or "pemangku raja" in Malay is the interim ruler of a Malay state if the king is elected as the Yang di-Pertuan Agong, or is unable to assume the role as head of state. For example, the regent of Pahang, Tengku Hassanal Ibrahim Alam Shah held the post after his father, Abdullah of Pahang was elected as the Yang di-Pertuan Agong, in 2019.

In the Philippines specifically, the University of Santo Tomas the Father Regent, who must be a Dominican priest and is often also a teacher, serves as the institution's spiritual head. They also form the Council of Regents that serves as the highest administrative council of the university.

Africa 
In Eswatini, where succession to the throne is not immediate, the Ndlovukati, a position similar to queen mother, rules as regent until the new king is determined.

Elsewhere, in Lagos, Nigeria, the Erelu Kuti rules the kingdom as regent whenever there isn't an Oba of Lagos. Much like in Eswatini, succession to the throne is not immediate, and the Erelu Kuti (a functionary of high rank in her own right) is charged with serving as its custodian until a replacement to the previous Oba is crowned.

See also
Queen mother
Empress dowager
Queen dowager
Shikken
List of regents
Regency Acts
Viceroy, an individual who, in a colony or province, exercised the power of a monarch on his or her behalf
Governor-General

References

 
 
Heads of state
Titles
Monarchy